Maquina may refer to:
 Màquina!, Spanish prog rock band
 La Máquina, the River Plate football team of the early 1940s
 Yank tank